Pierpont Community & Technical College (Pierpont) is a public community college in Fairmont, West Virginia.  Founded in 1974, it has the second largest enrollment of the community and technical colleges that make up the West Virginia Community and Technical College System. The college serves 13 counties in North Central West Virginia (Barbour, Braxton, Calhoun, Doddridge, Gilmer, Harrison, Lewis, Marion, Monongalia, Preston, Randolph, Taylor and Upshur) with classes offered at more than 15 locations throughout the region. Its headquarters is located in Fairmont, West Virginia. The student/faculty ratio is 17:1.

Pierpont is part of the state's growing high technology corridor with a metro area of about 50,000 residents. With an enrollment of more than 3,000, Pierpont offers more than 40 associate degree programs, skill sets and one-year certificates. It specializes in preparing students in two years or less for practical hands-on careers and provides non-credit enrichment courses for individuals and customized workplace trainings for local employers.

History
The college was first formed in 1974 as Fairmont State Community & Technical College; it was originally a component of Fairmont State College. In 2006, it was renamed Pierpont Community & Technical College after Francis H. Pierpont and it became a division of Fairmont State University. The following year, it became independent and was placed under the direction of its own board of governors.

Campus
Pierpont is headquartered at the Advanced Technology Center (ATC) main campus at the I-79 Technology Park in Fairmont, West Virginia. Fairmont, the seat of government for Marion County, is located approximately 90 miles south of Pittsburgh, Pennsylvania and has a population of about 19,000.

Pierpont offers a variety of courses at more than 15 sites in North Central West Virginia, including the Braxton County Center in Flatwoods, West Virginia and the Lewis County Center in Weston, West Virginia. Through its Center for Workforce Education, the college provides workforce training and community education for its 13-county region. Pierpont operates the Robert C. Byrd National Aerospace Education Center in Bridgeport, West Virginia which offers programs in flight and aviation maintenance. It also offers classes at the Gaston Caperton Center, a satellite campus in Clarksburg, West Virginia.

Pierpont officially opened the ATC on October 31, 2016.  The ATC is a 55,000+ square foot facility housing such Pierpont programs as IT/CyberSecurity, Petroleum Technology, Power Plant Technology, Advanced Manufacturing, Electrical Utility Technology, Health Information Technology, Medical Laboratory Technology, and Respiratory Care.

References

External links
 Official website

Educational institutions established in 2008
Education in Marion County, West Virginia
Buildings and structures in Marion County, West Virginia
West Virginia Community and Technical College System
2008 establishments in West Virginia